Schmoo torte is a Canadian dessert. Although it is relatively popular and well-known nationwide, it is most famous in Western Canada, especially Manitoba. It is a torte with layered whipped cream, caramel, and nuts, commonly made using angel food or sponge cake.

History

The schmoo torte was first invented in 1948 by a Winnipeg mother, Dora Zaslavsky, for her son Murray's Bar Mitzvah in Winnipeg, Manitoba. Zaslavsky was a Russian-Jewish immigrant who arrived to Canada in 1914.  She started introducing her recipes to Winnipeg via a catering business to support her family financially when her husband became ill. Zaslavsky's catering business eventually expanded across North America. Her schmoo torte became a favourite of singer Harry Belafonte.

Murray's daughter Shannon Aceman stated in an interview that her grandmother's schmoo torte "was basically a mix of about three or four of her other best-known recipes for cakes with the rum torte." Jewish food historian Kat Romanow told CTV News Winnipeg that schmoo is reminiscent of a central-European dessert called nusstorte. Romanow told CTV News: "In many cases, the dishes that Ashkenazi Jews brought with them to Canada came to be iconic dishes of their new homes."

How the schmoo got its name is unknown, however, some claim it comes from the name of the comic book creatures from Al Capp’s Li’l Abner.

See also
 List of desserts

References

External links
Restaurant recipe

Canadian desserts
Canadian cuisine
Cuisine of Manitoba

Cuisine of Western Canada